The 1936 Washington State Cougars football team was an American football team that represented Washington State College during the 1936 college football season. Head coach Babe Hollingbery led the team to a 6–2–1 mark in the PCC and 6–3–1 overall.

Schedule

References

Washington State
Washington State Cougars football seasons
Washington State Cougars football